The River Dyfi, also known as the River Dovey, is an approximately  long river in Wales.

Its large estuary forms the boundary between the counties of Gwynedd and Ceredigion, and its lower reaches have historically been considered the border between North Wales and South Wales.

Name
Nowadays the Welsh spelling Dyfi is widely used locally and by the Welsh Government, Natural Resources Wales and the BBC. The anglicised spelling Dovey continues to be used by some entities.

Sources 
It shares its watershed with the River Severn and the River Dee before flowing generally south-westwards down to a wide estuary. The only large town on its route is Machynlleth.

The river is prone to flooding and some roads in the lower catchment can become impassable during very wet weather.  It has been a relatively pristine river with few polluting inputs. The catchment area is notable for its now-defunct lead mines and slate quarries, especially around Corris and Dinas Mawddwy, and is notable for its salmon and sea trout (migratory brown trout).

Tributaries
The main tributaries of the River Dyfi are:

 Afon Leri at Ynyslas
 Afon Clettwr north of Tre'r Ddol
 Nant y Gog at Eglwys Fach
 Afon Einion at between Eglyws Fach and Glandyfi
 Afon Llyfnant at Glandyfi
 North Dulas at Ffridd Gate
 South Dulas east of Machynlleth
 Afon Ceirig at Mathafarn
 Afon Twymyn upstream of Cemmaes Road (Glantwymyn) 
 Afon Angell at Aberangell
 Afon Cleifion at Mallwyd 
 Afon Cerist at Dinas Mawddwy
 Afon Cywarch at Aber-Cywarch

Dyfi Bridge

The road bridge which crosses the river north of Machynlleth is a landmark.

Dyfi Biosphere

The area around Aberystwyth and the Dyfi Valley is known as the Dyfi Biosphere. It was UNESCO-designated in 1978. Within the biosphere are a number of Special Areas of Conservation and Sites of Special Scientific Interest (Cors Fochno, Coed Cwm Einion and Pen Llŷn a’r Sarnau).

In March 2021, Natural Resources Wales (NRW) granted Montgomeryshire Wildlife Trust a licence to release up to six beavers in the Dyfi Valley, the first official beaver release in Wales.

The estuary is known for its saltmarshes.

Film Location
The Dyfi estuary was used as a location shot in Led Zeppelin's 1976 film The Song Remains the Same.  The segment of the film is where Robert Plant comes ashore on a boat, after which he rides a horse, making his way to Raglan Castle.  The band's Bron-Yr-Aur cottage is located on the edge of Machynlleth.

In Print 
In 2022 Jim Perrin published an essay on the River Dyfi in “Rivers of Wales” (Gwasg Garreg Gwalch).

See also

 Dyfi National Nature Reserve
 Dyfi Valley Way

References

Dyfi
Dyfi
Dyfi
Dyfi